Casey Mittelstadt (born November 22, 1998) is an American professional ice hockey center for the Buffalo Sabres of the National Hockey League (NHL). He was selected in the first round, eighth overall, by the Sabres in the 2017 NHL Entry Draft.

Mittelstadt was born in Edina, Minnesota, but grew up in Eden Prairie, Minnesota.

Playing career

Amateur
Mittelstadt attended Eden Prairie High School and was chosen as ALL-USA Boys Hockey Player of the Year in 2016 and 2017. He was named Mr. Hockey, the best high school senior hockey player in Minnesota, in 2017. He was drafted in the first round, eighth overall, by the Buffalo Sabres in the 2017 NHL Entry Draft.

Mittelstadt having committed to a collegiate career, played as a freshman forward on the 2017–18 Minnesota Golden Gophers team. After ranking second on the team, and seventh among all NCAA freshmen, with 30 points Mittelstadt was selected for the Big Ten All-Freshman Team. He was also selected as a finalist for Freshman of the Year, along with Quinn Hughes and Mitchell Lewandowski, with the award eventually going to Lewandowski.

Professional
On March 26, 2018, Mittelstadt opted to conclude his collegiate career and was signed to a three-year entry-level contract by the Buffalo Sabres. He made his NHL debut on March 29 in a game against the Detroit Red Wings, recording an assist. He recorded his first career NHL goal on April 6, 2018, in a 7–5 loss to the Tampa Bay Lightning.

Rather than assign him to the AHL, Buffalo management opted to have Mittelstadt play the entire 2018–19 season with the team. He struggled throughout the year, recording just 12 goals and 13 assists for 25 points in 77 games.

After struggling again to start the 2019–20 season, Mittelstadt was assigned to the Rochester Americans, the Sabres' American Hockey League (AHL) affiliate, on December 15.

On December 23, 2020, Mittelstadt signed a one-year contract with the Sabres.

On September 2, 2021, Mittlestadt signed a three-year, $7.5 million contract with the Sabres.

International
Mittelstadt participated on Team USA in the 2018 World Junior Ice Hockey Championships. He helped lead the United States team to win bronze with a tournament high 11 points, and was selected as the tournament's Best Forward. A fan favorite, Mittelstadt was named to the tournament all-star team, and received the title of Tournament MVP by media.

Career statistics

Regular season and playoffs

International

Awards and honors

References

External links

1998 births
Living people
Buffalo Sabres draft picks
Buffalo Sabres players
Green Bay Gamblers players
Ice hockey players from Minnesota
Minnesota Golden Gophers men's ice hockey players
National Hockey League first-round draft picks
People from Eden Prairie, Minnesota
Rochester Americans players
USA Hockey National Team Development Program players
Sportspeople from Edina, Minnesota
American men's ice hockey centers